José Luis Rocha represented México in the 1984 Olympic Games in Diving. Rocha was born in México City.  He attended Auburn University where he was a member of the Swimming and Diving Teams from 1986 to 1989. Rocha was named "an All-American" each of his years at Auburn University, and won the 1987 National Collegiate Athletic Association (NCAA) National Championship on the 1-meter event.

He graduated from Auburn in 1989 with a bachelor's degree in Criminal Justice and moved to South Florida where he married U.S. Olympic Diver and Double Olympic Silver Medalist, Michele Mitchell, and became a US Citizen. Rocha worked as a police officer with the Delray Beach Police Department in Palm Beach County, and later moved with his family to Tucson, Arizona where he also served as a police officer. Michele Mitchell and Jose Luis Rocha were divorced in 2006 and Rocha moved to Austin, Texas where he worked as a Private Investigator. He joined the United States Army in 2007, and has deployed twice in support of Operation Iraqi Freedom and Operation New Dawn.

References

1966 births
Living people
Auburn Tigers men's swimmers
Mexican male divers
Divers at the 1984 Summer Olympics
Olympic divers of Mexico
Divers at the 1987 Pan American Games
Pan American Games bronze medalists for Mexico
Pan American Games medalists in diving
Medalists at the 1987 Pan American Games
20th-century Mexican people
21st-century Mexican people